Adolf or Adolfo Loning was a German official and writer who served as a lieutenant in the Guardia Real of Ferdinand VII of Spain during the 1830s. Travelling to Spain, he enlisted in the Carlist army commanded by Tomás de Zumalacárregui - in his own memoirs, he states "I was the first German to enlist"

Works 

 Die Fueros des Königreiches Navarra und der Baskischen Provinzen Alava, Biscaya und Guipuzcoa. Helmingsche Hofbuchhandlung, Hannover, 1843
 Das spanische Volk in seinen Ständen, Sitten und Gebräuchen mit Episoden aus dem Karlistischen Erbfolgekriege (El pueblo español en sus clases, costumbres y usos con episodios de la guerra de sucesión carlista). Verlag der Hanschen Hofbuchhandlung. Hannover, 1844

References 

Carlists
Military personnel of the First Carlist War